D7 is a state road connecting Beli Manastir, Osijek, Čepin and Đakovo to Slavonski Šamac border crossing to Bosnia and Herzegovina and to Duboševica border crossing to Hungary.

The D7 state road runs parallel to the A5 motorway along its entire length, connecting to virtually all A5 interchanges directly (Đakovo) or indirectly, thus serving as an alternate and backup road to the motorway. Since the A5 motorway is not completed to the national borders, the D7 road also serves as connecting road for A5 traffic 
to the border crossings to Hungary and Bosnia and Herzegovina.

The road, as well as all other state roads in Croatia, is managed and maintained by Hrvatske ceste.

Traffic volume 

Traffic is regularly counted and reported by Hrvatske ceste, operator of the road.

Road junctions and populated areas

Maps

Sources

D007
D007
D007